The R675 road is a regional road in Ireland which runs east–west from the R680 in Waterford city centre to the centre of Dungarvan, via Tramore, all in County Waterford.

See also
Roads in Ireland

References
Roads Act 1993 (Classification of Regional Roads) Order 2006 – Department of Transport

Regional roads in the Republic of Ireland
Roads in County Waterford
Dungarvan